Ch-paa-qn (Squaw) Peak is in Missoula County, Montana, United States. It is west of Missoula, Montana. Ch-paa-qn is a Salish word meaning "shining peak".

References

Mountains of Missoula County, Montana
Mountains of Montana